Ameur Derbal (born 1 July 1978) is a Tunisian retired footballer and later manager. He is the current manager of Saudi club Al-Najma.

He started and finished his career in JS Kairouan, and also had short stints in Libya and Ukraine.

After managing JS Kairouan, in 2020 he signed for Saudi club Al-Orobah FC. On 22 April 2022, Derbal was appointed as manager of Saudi club Al-Najma.

References

1978 births
Living people
People from Kairouan
Tunisian footballers
JS Kairouan players
Espérance Sportive de Tunis players
Olympique Béja players
EO Goulette et Kram players
FC Kharkiv players
Tunisian Ligue Professionnelle 1 players
Ukrainian Premier League players
Tunisian expatriate footballers
Expatriate footballers in Libya
Tunisian expatriate sportspeople in Libya
Expatriate footballers in Ukraine
Tunisian expatriate sportspeople in Ukraine
Tunisian football managers
JS Kairouan managers
Hatta Club managers
UAE First Division League managers
Saudi First Division League managers
Tunisian expatriate football managers
Tunisian expatriate sportspeople in the United Arab Emirates
Expatriate football managers in the United Arab Emirates
Expatriate football managers in Saudi Arabia
Tunisian expatriate sportspeople in Saudi Arabia
Association footballers not categorized by position